NGC 4918 is a spiral galaxy in the constellation Virgo. The object was discovered in 1886 by the American astronomer Francis Preserved Leavenworth.

References

Notes 

Unbarred spiral galaxies
Virgo (constellation)
4918
044934